Proletarskyi District is an urban district of the city of Donetsk, Ukraine.

Created in 1937 as Budonivskyi District, in 1958 it was renamed into the Proletarskyi District. In 1980 some of its territories were transferred to another Budonivskyi District. "Proletarskyi" means "proletarian".

External links
 Proletarskyi District at the Mayor of Donetsk website
 Proletarskyi District at the Uzovka website

Urban districts of Donetsk